Diergaardt may refer to:

 Floris Diergaardt (born 1980), Namibian football striker
 Hans Diergaardt (1927–1998), Namibian politician
 Johan Diergaardt, Namibian rugby union coach
 Reggie Diergaardt (born 1957), Namibian politician and former member of the National Assembly of Namibia
 Theo Diergaardt (1969/70–2020), Namibian politician and Member of Parliament
 Diergaarde Blijdorp, a zoo in Rotterdam, Netherlands